The 2018–19 Indiana Pacers season was Indiana's 52nd season as a franchise and 43rd season in the NBA.

The Pacers endured a major setback when their star player, Victor Oladipo, suffered a season-ending knee injury in a January game against Toronto. Oladipo was nevertheless voted an All-Star reserve. The Pacers struggled after Oladipo's injury, posting a 16–19 record during the rest of the season. Despite their late-season struggles, the Pacers clinched a playoff appearance and matched their 48–34 record from the previous year.

The Pacers were defeated in four games by the Boston Celtics in the first round of the playoffs. For the second time in three years the Pacers were swept in the playoffs, and the loss marked their fourth consecutive defeat in the first round.

NBA draft

Roster

Standings

Division

Conference

Game log

Preseason

|- style="background:#bfb;"
| 1
| October 4
| @ Houston
| 
| Victor Oladipo (24)
| Leaf, Sabonis (12)
| T. J. Leaf (4)
| Toyota Center17,089
| 1–0
|- style="background:#fcc;"
| 2
| October 6
| @ Memphis
| 
| Aaron Holiday (20)
| Domantas Sabonis (14)
| Cory Joseph (6)
| FedEx Forum11,615
| 1–1
|- style="background:#bfb;"
| 3
| October 8
| @ Cleveland
| 
| Victor Oladipo (23)
| Domantas Sabonis (12)
| Tyreke Evans (6)
| Quicken Loans Arena16,330
| 2–1
|- style="background:#fcc;"
| 4
| October 10
| @ Chicago
| 
| Thaddeus Young (16)
| Thaddeus Young (10)
| Darren Collison (5)
| United Center17,162
| 2–2

Regular season

|- style="background:#cfc
| 1
| October 17
| Memphis
| 111–83
| Bojan Bogdanovic (19)
| Domantas Sabonis (15)
| Tyreke Evans (6)
| Bankers Life Fieldhouse17,923
| 1–0
|- style="background:#fcc
| 2
| October 19
| @ Milwaukee
| 101–118
| Victor Oladipo (25)
| Domantas Sabonis (13)
| Tyreke Evans (4)
| Fiserv Forum17,341
| 1–1
|- style="background:#cfc
| 3
| October 20
| Brooklyn
| 132–112
| Victor Oladipo (25)
| Myles Turner (8)
| Cory Joseph (6)
| Bankers Life Fieldhouse17,007
| 2–1
|- style="background:#fcc
| 4
| October 22
| @ Minnesota
| 91–101
| Oladipo, Bogdanovic (20)
| Oladipo, Sabonis (7)
| Darren Collison (6)
| Target Center10,371
| 2–2
|- style="background:#cfc
| 5
| October 24
| @ San Antonio
| 116–96
| Victor Oladipo (21)
| Domantas Sabonis (10)
| Victor Oladipo (9)
| AT&T Center18,354
| 3–2
|- style="background:#cfc
| 6
| October 27
| @ Cleveland
| 119–107
| Victor Oladipo (24)
| Sabonis, Joseph (5)
| Oladipo, Collison (6)
| Quicken Loans Arena19,432
| 4–2
|- style="background:#fcc
| 7
| October 29
| Portland
| 93–103
| Victor Oladipo (21)
| Victor Oladipo (9)
| Victor Oladipo (7)
| Bankers Life Fieldhouse15,788
| 4–3
|- style="background:#cfc
| 8
| October 31
| @ New York
| 107–101
| Victor Oladipo (24)
| Thaddeus Young (10)
| Joseph, Collison (6)
| Madison Square Garden 18,295
| 5–3

|- style="background:#cfc
| 9
| November 2
| @ Chicago
| 107–105
| Victor Oladipo (25)
| Victor Oladipo (14)
| Victor Oladipo (5)
| United Center 19,704
| 6–3
|- style="background:#cfc
| 10
| November 3
| Boston
| 102–101
| Victor Oladipo (24)
| Victor Oladipo (12)
| Sabonis, Young (5)
| Bankers Life Fieldhouse17,505
| 7–3
|- style="background:#fcc
| 11
| November 5
| Houston
| 94–98
| Victor Oladipo (28)
| Thaddeus Young (11)
| Domantas Sabonis (5)
| Bankers Life Fieldhouse14,735
| 7–4
|-style="background:#fcc
| 12
| November 7
| Philadelphia
| 94–100
| Victor Oladipo (36)
| Domantas Sabonis (11)
| Victor Oladipo (7)
| Bankers Life Fieldhouse16,434
| 7–5
|- style="background:#cfc
| 13
| November 9
| @ Miami
| 110–102
| Victor Oladipo (22)
| Domantas Sabonis (11)
| Victor Oladipo (10)
| American Airlines Arena19,600
| 8–5
|- style="background:#fcc
| 14
| November 11
| @ Houston
| 103–115
| Victor Oladipo (22)
| Victor Oladipo (10)
| Victor Oladipo (7)
| Toyota Center18,055
| 8–6
|- style="background:#cfc
| 15
| November 16
| Miami
| 99–91
| Tyreke Evans (23)
| Domantas Sabonis (12)
| Oladipo, Joseph (5)
| Bankers Life Fieldhouse17,923
| 9–6
|- style="background:#cfc
| 16
| November 17
| Atlanta
| 97–89
| Bojan Bogdanovic (22)
| Domantas Sabonis (16)
| Domantas Sabonis (6)
| Bankers Life Fieldhouse17,491
| 10–6
|- style="background:#cfc;"
| 17
| November 19
| Utah
| 121–94
| Bojan Bogdanovic (21)
| Domantas Sabonis (9)
| Darren Collison (7)
| Bankers Life Fieldhouse17,000
| 11–6
|- style="background:#fcc;"
| 18
| November 21
| @ Charlotte
| 109–127
| Bojan Bogdanovic (20)
| Myles Turner (7)
| Cory Joseph (7)
| Spectrum Center15,913
| 11–7
|- style="background:#fcc;"
| 19
| November 23
| San Antonio
|100–111
|Bojan Bogdanovic (21)
|Domantas Sabonis (16)
|Cory Joseph (7)
| Bankers Life Fieldhouse17,262
|11–8
|- style="background:#cfc;"
| 20
| November 26
| @ Utah
|121–88
|Doug McDermott (21)
|Domantas Sabonis (10)
|Darren Collison (11)
| Vivint Smart Home Arena18,306
|12–8
|- style="background:#cfc;"
| 21
| November 27
| @ Phoenix
|109–104
|McDermott, Sabonis (21)
|Domantas Sabonis (16)
|Darren Collison (11)
| Talking Stick Resort Arena13,038
|13–8
|- style="background:#fcc;"
| 22
| November 29
| @ L.A. Lakers
|96–104
|Domantas Sabonis (20)
|Domantas Sabonis (15)
|Cory Joseph (6)
| Staples Center18,997
| 13–9

|- style="background:#fcc;"
| 23
| December 1
| @ Sacramento
|110–111
|Bojan Bogdanovic (27)
|Myles Turner (12)
|Darren Collison (12)
| Golden 1 Center17,583
| 13–10
|- style="background:#cfc;"
| 24
| December 4
| Chicago
| 96–90
| Darren Collison (23)
| Myles Turner, Sabonis (11)
| Turner, Joseph, Collison, Holiday (3)
| Bankers Life Fieldhouse16,446
| 14–10
|- style="background:#cfc;"
| 25
| December 7
| @ Orlando
|112–90
| Bojan Bogdanovic (26)
| Kyle O'Quinn (10)
| Darren Collison (8)
| Amway Center17,214
| 15–10
|- style="background:#cfc;"
| 26
| December 8
| Sacramento
| 107–97
| Thaddeus Young (20)
| Myles Turner (13)
| Cory Joseph (8)
| Bankers Life Fieldhouse16,867
| 16–10
|- style="background:#cfc;"
| 27
| December 10
| Washington
| 109–101
| Myles Turner (26)
| Turner, Young (12)
| Darren Collison (17)
| Bankers Life Fieldhouse14,645
| 17–10
|- style="background:#cfc;"
| 28
| December 12
| Milwaukee
| 113–97
| Thaddeus Young (25)
| Thaddeus Young (11)
| Darren Collison (7)
| Bankers Life Fieldhouse17,070
| 18–10
|- style="background:#cfc;"
| 29
| December 14
| @ Philadelphia
| 113–101
| Thaddeus Young (26)
| Domantas Sabonis (16)
| Darren Collison (10)
| Wells Fargo Center20,337
| 19–10
|- style="background:#cfc;"
| 30
| December 16
| New York
| 110–99
| Victor Oladipo (26)
| Domantas Sabonis (12)
| Victor Oladipo (7)
| Bankers Life Fieldhouse16,646
| 20–10
|- style="background:#fcc;"
| 31
| December 18
| Cleveland
| 91–92
| Domantas Sabonis (17)
| Myles Turner (10)
| Victor Oladipo (10)
| Bankers Life Fieldhouse15,630
| 20–11
|- style="background:#fcc;"
| 32
| December 19
| @ Toronto
| 96–99
| Victor Oladipo (20)
| Myles Turner (14)
| Collison, Oladipo (4)
| Scotiabank Arena19,800
| 20–12
|- style="background:#cfc;"
| 33
| December 21
| @ Brooklyn
| 114–106
| Victor Oladipo (26)
| Myles Turner (12)
| Victor Oladipo (6)
| Barclays Center13,302
| 21–12
|-style="background:#cfc;"
| 34
| December 23
| Washington
| 105–89
| Myles Turner (18)
| Myles Turner (17)
| Victor Oladipo (9)
| Bankers Life Fieldhouse17,923
| 22–12
|- style="background:#cfc;"
| 35
| December 26
| @ Atlanta
| 129–121
| Thaddeus Young (21)
| Domantas Sabonis (8)
| Darren Collison (8)
| State Farm Arena15,026
| 23–12
|- style="background:#cfc;"
| 36
| December 28
| Detroit
| 125–88
|  Collison, Sabonis (19)
| Domantas Sabonis (12)
| Victor Oladipo (8)
| Bankers Life Fieldhouse17,923
| 24–12
|- style="background:#cfc;"
| 37
| December 31
| Atlanta
| 116–108
| Victor Oladipo (22)
| Turner, Sabonis (8)
| Victor Oladipo (7)
| Bankers Life Fieldhouse17,923
| 25–12

|- style="background:#cfc;"
| 38
| January 4
| @ Chicago
| 119–116 (OT)
| Victor Oladipo (36)
| Domantas Sabonis (12)
| Cory Joseph (6)
| United Center21,284
| 26–12
|- style="background:#fcc;"
| 39
| January 6
| @ Toronto
| 105–121
| Bojan Bogdanovic (21)
| Domantas Sabonis (11)
| Domantas Sabonis (6)
| Scotiabank Arena19,800
| 26–13
|- style="background:#cfc;"
| 40
| January 8
| @ Cleveland
| 123–115
| Thaddeus Young (26)
| Domantas Sabonis (9)
| Darren Collison (9)
| Quicken Loans Arena19,432
| 27–13
|- style="background:#fcc;"
| 41
| January 9
| @ Boston
| 108–135
| Domantas Sabonis (20)
| Thaddeus Young (8)
| Evans, Sabonis (5)
| TD Garden18,624
| 27–14
|- style="background:#cfc;"
| 42
| January 11
| @ New York
| 121–106
| Domantas Sabonis (22)
| Domantas Sabonis (15)
| Darren Collison (10)
| Madison Square Garden19,812
| 28–14
|- style="background:#cfc;"
| 43
| January 15
| Phoenix
| 131–97
| Evans, Bogdanovic (20)
| Domantas Sabonis (8)
| Darren Collison (7)
| Bankers Life Fieldhouse15,698
| 29–14
|- style="background:#fcc;"
| 44
| January 17
| Philadelphia
| 96–120
| Thaddeus Young (27)
| Myles Turner (12)
| Victor Oladipo (7)
| Bankers Life Fieldhouse16,007
| 29–15
|- style="background:#cfc;"
| 45
| January 19
| Dallas
| 111–99
| Tyreke Evans (19)
| Domantas Sabonis (11)
| Victor Oladipo (6)
| Bankers Life Fieldhouse17,508
| 30–15
|- style="background:#cfc;"
| 46
| January 20
| Charlotte
| 120–95
| Victor Oladipo (21)
| Myles Turner (13)
| Darren Collison (9)
| Bankers Life Fieldhouse15,015
| 31–15
|- style="background:#cfc;"
| 47
| January 23
| Toronto
| 110–106
| Thaddeus Young (23)
| Thaddeus Young (15)
| Darren Collison (8)
| Bankers Life Fieldhouse16,879
| 32–15
|- style="background:#fcc;"
| 48
| January 26
| @ Memphis
| 103–106
| Bojan Bogdanovic (21)
| Young, Sabonis (8)
| Darren Collison (9)
| FedExForum14,486
| 32–16
|- style="background:#fcc;"
| 49
| January 28
| Golden State
| 100–132
| Myles Turner (16)
| Thaddeus Young (7)
| Darren Collison (8)
| Bankers Life Fieldhouse17,923
| 32–17
|- style="background:#fcc;"
| 50
| January 30
| @ Washington
| 89–107
| Thaddeus Young (13)
| Domantas Sabonis (8)
| Cory Joseph (6)
| Capital One Arena15,354
| 32–18
|- style=background:#fcc;"
| 51
| January 31
| @ Orlando
| 100–107
| Myles Turner (27)
| Thaddeus Young (10)
| Darren Collison (10)
| Amway Center16,625
| 32–19

|- style="background:#cfc;"
| 52
| February 2
| @ Miami
| 95–88
| Bojan Bogdanovic (31)
| Domantas Sabonis (10)
| Collison, Joseph (10)
| American Airlines Arena19,600
| 33–19
|- style="background:#cfc;"
| 53
| February 4
| @ New Orleans
| 109–107
| Darren Collison (22)
| Domantas Sabonis (13)
| Darren Collison (6)
| Smoothie King Center15,780
| 34–19
|- style="background:#cfc;"
| 54
| February 5
| L.A. Lakers
| 136–94
| Bojan Bogdanovic (24)
| Thaddeus Young (11)
| Thaddeus Young (8)
| Bankers Life Fieldhouse17,265
| 35–19
|- style="background:#cfc;"
| 55
| February 7
| L.A. Clippers
| 116–92
| Bojan Bogdanovic (29)
| Domantas Sabonis (8)
| Domantas Sabonis (6)
| Bankers Life Fieldhouse15,756
| 36–19
|- style="background:#cfc;"
| 56
| February 9
| Cleveland
| 105–90
| Bojan Bogdanovic (23)
| Domantas Sabonis (10)
| Darren Collison (9)
| Bankers Life Fieldhouse17,923
| 37–19
|- style="background:#cfc;"
| 57
| February 11
| Charlotte
| 99–90
| Myles Turner (18)
| Domantas Sabonis (9)
| Darren Collison (8)
| Bankers Life Fieldhouse17,165
| 38–19
|- style="background:#fcc;"
| 58
| February 13
| Milwaukee
| 97–106
| Myles Turner (20)
| Domantas Sabonis (9)
| Darren Collison (7)
| Bankers Life Fieldhouse17,311
| 38–20
|- style="background:#cfc;"
|  59
| February 22
| New Orleans
| 126–111
| Wesley Matthews (24)
| Domantas Sabonis (13)
| Darren Collison (12)
| Bankers Life Fieldhouse16,962
| 39–20
|- style="background:#cfc;"
| 60
| February 23
| @ Washington
| 119–112
| Thaddeus Young (22)
| Domantas Sabonis (12)
| O'Quinn, Collison (5)
| Capital One Arena19,648
| 40–20
|- style="background:#fcc;"
| 61
| February 25
| @ Detroit
| 109–113
| Bojan Bogdanovic (25)
| Thaddeus Young (12)
| Darren Collison (5)
| Little Caesars Arena15,321
| 40–21
|- style="background:#fcc;"
| 62
| February 27
| @ Dallas
| 101–110
| Bojan Bogdanovic (22)
| T. J. Leaf (7)
| Thaddeus Young (5)
| American Airlines Center19,978
| 40–22
|- style="background:#cfc;"
| 63
| February 28
| Minnesota
| 122–115
| Bojan Bogdanovic (37)
| Bogdanovic, Collison (7)
| Cory Joseph (12)
| Bankers Life Fieldhouse17,003
| 41–22

|- style="background:#fcc;"
| 64
| March 2
| Orlando
| 112–117
| Bojan Bogdanovic (25)
| Young, Turner (6)
| Darren Collison (10)
| Bankers Life Fieldhouse17,923
| 41–23
|- style="background:#cfc;"
| 65
| March 5
| Chicago
| 105–96
| Bojan Bogdanovic (27)
| Myles Turner (11)
| Thaddeus Young (6)
| Bankers Life Fieldhouse15,753
| 42–23
|- style="background:#fcc;"
| 66
| March 7
| @ Milwaukee
| 98–117
| Myles Turner (22)
| Myles Turner (17)
| Darren Collison (9)
| Fiserv Forum17,884
| 42–24
|- style="background:#fcc;"
| 67
| March 10
| @ Philadelphia
| 89–106
| Bojan Bogdanovic (18)
| Thaddeus Young (9)
| Domantas Sabonis (6)
| Wells Fargo Center20,636
| 42–25
|- style="background:#cfc;"
| 68
| March 12
| New York
| 103–98
| Bojan Bogdanovic (24)
| Myles Turner (9)
| Darren Collison (9)
| Bankers Life Fieldhouse16,679
| 43–25
|- style="background:#cfc;"
| 69
| March 14
| Oklahoma City
| 108–106
| Bojan Bogdanovic (23)
| Matthews, Sabonis (7)
| Darren Collison (7)
| Bankers Life Fieldhouse16,656
| 44–25
|- style="background:#fcc;"
| 70
| March 16
| @ Denver
| 100–102
| Thaddeus Young (18)
| Thaddeus Young (10)
| Wesley Matthews (4)
| Pepsi Center19,856
| 44–26
|- style="background:#fcc;"
| 71
| March 18
| @ Portland
| 98–106
| Myles Turner (28)
| Young, Turner (10)
| Darren Collison (7)
| Moda Center19,393
| 44–27
|- style="background:#fcc;"
| 72
| March 19
| @ L.A. Clippers
| 109–115
| Bogdanovic, Evans (19)
| Domantas Sabonis (16)
| Tyreke Evans (7)
| Staples Center16,043
| 44–28
|- style="background:#fcc;"
| 73
| March 21
| @ Golden State 
| 89–112
| Tyreke Evans (20)
| Domantas Sabonis (12)
| Kyle O'Quinn (4)
| Oracle Arena19,596
| 44–29
|- style="background:#cfc;"
| 74
| March 24
| Denver
| 124–88
| Bojan Bogdanovic (35)
| Domantas Sabonis (13)
| Young, Matthews, Holiday (5)
| Bankers Life Fieldhouse17,920
| 45–29
|- style="background:#fcc;"
| 75
| March 27
| @ Oklahoma City
| 99–107
| Bojan Bogdanovic (28)
| Myles Turner (14)
| Darren Collison (6)
| Chesapeake Energy Arena18,203
| 45–30
|- style="background:#fcc;"
| 76
| March 29
| @ Boston
| 112–114
| Bojan Bogdanovic (27)
| Myles Turner (11)
| Darren Collison (7)
| TD Garden18,624
| 45–31
|- style="background:#fcc;"
| 77
| March 30
| Orlando
| 116–121
| Bojan Bogdanovic (22)
| Myles Turner (12)
| Darren Collison (9)
| Bankers Life Fieldhouse17,923
| 45–32

|- style="background:#cfc;"
| 78
| April 1
| Detroit
| 111–102
| Young, Bogdanovic (19)
| Domantas Sabonis (12)
| Bojan Bogdanovic (6)
| Bankers Life Fieldhouse15,760
| 46–32
|- style="background:#cfc;"
| 79
| April 3
| @ Detroit
| 108–89
| Thaddeus Young (21)
| Domantas Sabonis (13)
| Cory Joseph (12)
| Little Caesars Arena18,984
| 47–32
|- style="background:#fcc;"
| 80
| April 5
| Boston
| 97–117
| Myles Turner (15)
| Turner, Evans (7)
| Cory Joseph (8)
| Bankers Life Fieldhouse17,371
| 47–33
|- style="background:#fcc;"
| 81
| April 7
| Brooklyn
| 96–108
| Domantas Sabonis (17)
| Domantas Sabonis (12)
| Aaron Holiday (7)
| Bankers Life Fieldhouse16,197
| 47–34
|- style="background:#cfc;"
| 82
| April 10
| @ Atlanta
| 135–134
| T. J. Leaf (28)
| Alize Johnson (11)
| Tyreke Evans (5)
| State Farm Arena17,143
| 48–34

Playoffs

|- style="background:#fcc;"
| 1
| April 14
| @ Boston
| 
| Cory Joseph (24)
| Domantas Sabonis (9)
| Thaddeus Young (6)
| TD Garden18,624
| 0–1
|- style="background:#fcc;"
| 2
| April 17
| @ Boston
| 
| Bojan Bogdanovic (23)
| Bojan Bogdanovic (8)
| Sabonis, Matthews (5)
| TD Garden18,624
| 0–2
|- style="background:#fcc;"
| 3
| April 19
| Boston
| 
| Tyreke Evans (19)
| Thaddeus Young (9)
| Domantas Sabonis (6)
| Bankers Life Fieldhouse17,923
| 0–3
|- style="background:#fcc;"
| 4
| April 21
| Boston
| 
|  Bojan Bogdanovic (23)
|  Thaddeus Young (9)
|  Darren Collison (5)
| Bankers Life Fieldhouse17,923
| 0–4

Player statistics

Regular season

|-
| align="left"|‡ || align="center"| C
| 3 || 0 || 6 || 3 || 1 || 0 || 1 || 0
|-
| align="left"| || align="center"| SF
| 81 || style=";"|81 || style=";"|2,573 || 333 || 161 || 69 || 1 || style=";"|1,454
|-
| align="left"| || align="center"| PG
| 76 || 76 || 2,143 || 232 || style=";"|459 || 110 || 9 || 853
|-
| align="left"| || align="center"| SG
| 69 || 18 || 1,402 || 201 || 166 || 58 || 18 || 706
|-
| align="left"| || align="center"| PG
| 50 || 0 || 646 || 67 || 87 || 21 || 13 || 294
|-
| align="left"| || align="center"| PF
| 14 || 0 || 64 || 19 || 1 || 1 || 3 || 13
|-
| align="left"| || align="center"| PG
| style=";"|82 || 9 || 2,063 || 279 || 321 || 94 || 22 || 537
|-
| align="left"| || align="center"| PF
| 58 || 1 || 522 || 125 || 24 || 9 || 19 || 225
|-
| align="left"|≠ || align="center"| SG
| 23 || 23 || 725 || 65 || 55 || 20 || 4 || 251
|-
| align="left"| || align="center"| SF
| 77 || 1 || 1,340 || 109 || 67 || 18 || 8 || 564
|-
| align="left"| || align="center"| C
| 45 || 3 || 371 || 119 || 56 || 9 || 25 || 156
|-
| align="left"| || align="center"| SG
| 36 || 36 || 1,147 || 202 || 186 || 60 || 11 || 675
|-
| align="left"| || align="center"| SG
| 10 || 0 || 47 || 6 || 3 || 1 || 0 || 12
|-
| align="left"| || align="center"| C
| 74 || 5 || 1,838 || style=";"|690 || 212 || 48 || 30 || 1,043
|-
| align="left"| || align="center"| PG
| 23 || 2 || 210 || 24 || 10 || 12 || 5 || 66
|-
| align="left"| || align="center"| C
| 74 || 74 || 2,119 || 531 || 115 || 60 || style=";"|199 || 984
|-
| align="left"| || align="center"| PF
| 81 || style=";"|81 || 2,489 || 523 || 204 || style=";"|123 || 36 || 1,024
|}
After all games.
‡Waived during the season
†Traded during the season
≠Acquired during the season

Playoffs

|-
| align="left"| || align="center"| SF
| style=";"|4 || style=";"|4 || style=";"|148 || 23 || 11 || 8 || 0 || style=";"|72
|-
| align="left"| || align="center"| PG
| style=";"|4 || style=";"|4 || 117 || 12 || style=";"|16 || 2 || 0 || 48
|-
| align="left"| || align="center"| SG
| style=";"|4 || 0 || 84 || 17 || 3 || 2 || 1 || 61
|-
| align="left"| || align="center"| PG
| 3 || 0 || 13 || 0 || 0 || 0 || 0 || 5
|-
| align="left"| || align="center"| PG
| style=";"|4 || 0 || 85 || 7 || 4 || 4 || 0 || 30
|-
| align="left"| || align="center"| PF
| 1 || 0 || 10 || 3 || 0 || 0 || 0 || 2
|-
| align="left"| || align="center"| SG
| style=";"|4 || style=";"|4 || 119 || 10 || 8 || 3 || 1 || 28
|-
| align="left"| || align="center"| SF
| 3 || 0 || 29 || 5 || 4 || 0 || 1 || 6
|-
| align="left"| || align="center"| C
| 1 || 0 || 2 || 0 || 0 || 0 || 0 || 0
|-
| align="left"| || align="center"| C
| style=";"|4 || 0 || 96 || style=";"|29 || style=";"|16 || 3 || 1 || 34
|-
| align="left"| || align="center"| PG
| 1 || 0 || 2 || 2 || 0 || 0 || 0 || 0
|-
| align="left"| || align="center"| C
| style=";"|4 || style=";"|4 || 126 || 25 || 6 || 0 || style=";"|7 || 39
|-
| align="left"| || align="center"| PF
| style=";"|4 || style=";"|4 || 130 || 28 || 15 || style=";"|11 || 3 || 42
|}

Transactions

Free agents

Re-signed

Additions

Subtractions

References

Indiana Pacers seasons
Indiana Pacers
Indiana Pacers
Indiana Pacers